Jizi or Qizi or Kizi (Gija or Kija in Korean) was a semi-legendary Chinese sage who is said to have ruled Gija Joseon in the 11th century BCE. Early Chinese documents like the Book of Documents and the Bamboo Annals described him as a virtuous relative of the last king of the Shang dynasty who was punished for remonstrating with the king. After Shang was overthrown by Zhou in the 1040s BCE, he allegedly gave political advice to King Wu, the first Zhou king. Chinese texts from the Han dynasty (206 BCE – 220 CE) onwards claimed that King Wu enfeoffed Jizi as ruler of Chaoxian (朝鮮, pronounced "Joseon" in Korean). According to the Book of Han (1st century CE), Jizi brought agriculture, sericulture, and many other facets of Chinese civilization to Joseon. His family name was Zi/Ja (子) and given name was Xuyu/Suyu (胥餘/서여 xūyú/seoyeo, or 須臾/수유 xūyú/suyu).

Gija (the Korean pronunciation of "Jizi") may have been the object of a state cult in sixth-century Goguryeo, and a mausoleum to him was established in Goryeo in 1102, but the first extant Korean text to mention Gija was the Samguk Sagi (1145). Starting in the late thirteenth century, Gija was fully integrated into Korean history, being described as a successor to the descendants of Dangun in the state of Old Joseon. Following the spread of Neo-Confucianism in Korea in the fourteenth century, scholars of the Joseon Dynasty (est. 1392) promoted Gija as a culture hero alongside Dangun.

However, with the development of radiocarbon dating and newly found excavations, modern Korean historians started to question the legitimacy of his enfeoffment as ruler of Gojoseon. Shin Chaeho (1880–1936) was the first to question the extent of Gija's cultural contributions and many followed as Gija's historical claims did not align with archeological evidence found during the time of his supposed rule. Additionally, post-war Korean scholars in both North and South Korea have strongly criticized the story of Gija's migration to Korea in the eleventh century BCE, claiming that his involvement in the history of Korea was widely exaggerated.

In recent times, both North and South Korea, and their respective historians do not officially recognize Jizi and his supposed accomplishments, making China the only nation that still supports his claims.

In ancient Chinese texts

Pre-Qin sources 
The earliest known mention of Jizi is in the "Mingyi" 明夷 hexagram of the Book of Change. According to other ancient Chinese texts like the Book of Documents, the Analects, and the Bamboo Annals, Jizi was a relative of King Zhou, the last ruler of the Shang Dynasty, and one of the three wise men of Shang, along with Weizi (微子) and Bi Gan. Many  identify him as Grand Tutor of the king. Jizi was either imprisoned or enslaved for remonstrating against King Zhou's misrule. (One later version states that he pretended to be mad after Bigan had been killed by King Zhou.) After Shang was overthrown by the Zhou dynasty in the mid eleventh century BC, Jizi was released by King Wu, to whom he gave advice on how to rule the new polity.

These texts mention neither Joseon nor Jizi's descendants; they simply describe Jizi as a virtuous man who was trusted by King Wu of Zhou after having been mistreated by the last Shang king.

Han and later texts 
The first texts that make an explicit connection between Jizi and Joseon date from the second century BC, under the Han dynasty. The earliest known source stating that Jizi went to Joseon is the Shangshu dazhuan (尚書大傳), a commentary on the Book of Documents attributed to Fu Sheng of the second century BC. In that account, King Wu enfeoffed Jizi as the ruler of Joseon and Jizi became the subject of King Wu. In a similar story recorded in Sima Qian's Records of the Grand Historian (or Shiji, compiled between 109 and 91 BC), Jizi was enfeoffed by King Wu but did not become his subject. Sima Qian did not mention Jizi in his section on contemporary Joseon (i.e. northwestern Korea), where Wei Man's kingdom had flourished since about 194 BC until it was conquered by the Han Dynasty in 108 BC. Thus the location of Joseon as in these earlier sources is not clear. Among other Han dynasty sources, the Han shi waizhuan mentions to Jizi but not his migration to Joseon.

The "Monograph on Geography" (Dili zhi 地理志) of the Book of Han (1st century AD) claims that Jizi had taught the people of Joseon agriculture, sericulture, and weaving, as well as proper ceremony. Jae-hoon Shim interprets the following sentence in that section of the Hanshu as claiming that Jizi also introduced the law of "Eight Prohibitions" (犯禁八條) in Joseon. The Records of Three Kingdoms (first published in the early fifth century) claims that the descendants of Jizi reigned as kings of Joseon for forty generations until they were overthrown by Wei Man, a man from the state of Yan, in 194 BC.

According to his commentary to the Shiji, Du Yu (first half of the 3rd century) states that the tomb of Jizi was located in Meng Prefecture of the State of Liang (modern-day Henan). This suggests that the story of Jizi's association with Joseon was not necessarily prevailing although the narrative seen in the Hanshu later became common.

As historian Jae-hoon Shim concludes, only during the Han dynasty (206 BC – 220 AD) did Jizi begin to be associated with Joseon, and only after the Han were his descendants identified as the Joseon royal family.

Interpretations of Gija in Korea

Ancient Korean accounts 
The first extant Korean text to mention Gija (the Korean pronunciation of Jizi) was Kim Busik's Samguk Sagi (completed in 1145), which claimed that Gija had been enfeoffed in Haedong (海東: Korea) by the Zhou court, but commented that this account was uncertain because of the brevity of the sources. Only in the thirteenth century did Korean texts start to integrate Gija more fully into Korean history. The Samguk Yusa (1281) explained that after being enfeoffed by King Wu of Zhou, Gija replaced Dangun's descendants as the ruler of Joseon, whereas Jewang Ungi (1287) identified Dangun and Gija as the first rulers of former and latter Joseon respectively. Most premodern Korean historians after that accepted that Gija had replaced another indigenous power (represented by Dangun) in Old Joseon.

In 1102, during the Goryeo Dynasty, King Sukjong built a mausoleum to Gija in a place near Pyongyang that had been identified as Gija's tomb.Sadang for gija called gijasa (箕子祠) was also built in Pyongyang. The mausoleum was rebuilt in 1324 and was repaired in 1355, but the cult of Gija spread most widely after the establishment of the Joseon Dynasty in 1392. Because Joseon's state ideology was Neo-Confucianism borrowed from China, Joseon intellectuals promoted Gija as a culture hero who had raised Korean civilization to the same level as China.

From the second half of the sixteenth century to the eighteenth century, Joseon scholars published a number of books on Gija. In 1580, Yun Dusu (尹斗壽) collated all available material on him and published his research as the Gijaji (箕子志; "Record of Gija"). On the same year, eminent scholar Yi I used Yun's book to compile the Gija Silgi (箕子實記), or True Account of Gija. Yi praised Gija for introducing agriculture, sericulture, decorum, the well-field system, and the Eight Prohibitions. Though he emphasized Gija's independence from King Wu of Zhou, Yi believed that Gija's teachings helped Korea to reach the same level of civilization as China. The cult of Gija also continued as temples which worshiped gija portraits called gijayeongjeon (箕子影殿), were built in the 18th century in South Pyongan Province.

Although Korean scholars became more critical of Gija's role in the eighteenth and nineteenth centuries, this account of Gija as the "bearer of civilization from China" became widely accepted, so much that by the late Joseon, the worship of Gija "had become an integral part of Korean cultural identity." Some Korean clans claim to be direct descendants of Gija himself.

Twentieth century accounts 
In the beginning of the twentieth century, Korean historians started to doubt the authenticity of his supposed influence. Shin Chaeho (1880–1936), a Korean independence nationalistic activist historian during the Japanese occupation, was the first to question the extent of Gija's contributions. In an essay titled Doksa Sillon ("New Reading of History"; 1908), he argued that Korean history was revolved around Dangun, the legendary founder of the state of Gojoseon. Shin dismissed Gija's contributions due to his foreign origin. Shin also argued that Gija had become a vassal of the Kings of Buyeo and was only given control of a small territory.

Other historians such as Choe Nam-seon (1890–1957) and Lee Byeong-do (1896–1989) started to notice discrepancies between pre-Qin Chinese records of Jizi/Gija, and later accounts (both Chinese and Korean) of his role in Joseon. In 1973, archeologist Kim Cheong-bae (金貞培) denied Chinese influence on Korea because no ancient Chinese bronzes had been found on the peninsula.

In addition, Ri Chirin, a leading North Korean historian of ancient Korea, argued that the Gija legend had been forged in Han times when the Chinese started to occupy part of Joseon. Most North Korean scholars have followed Ri in doubting the authenticity of Gija's migration to Joseon.

Modern Korean accounts 
Modern Korean scholars also deny the existence of Gija's involvement in Gija Joseon for various reasons. They point to the Bamboo Annals and the Confucian Analects, which were among the first works to mention Gija, but do not mention his migration to Gojoseon. However, some Gija enthusiasts suggest that Gija Joseon may have coexisted with Dangun, and that Gija Joseon was established at the western end of Gojoseon. This claim is mostly denied by modern Korean historians.

In addition, detractors of the Gija Joseon theory also point out that the cultural artifacts found in the region do not appear to have Chinese origins. An example of such an artifact is found in a Gojoseon mandolin-shaped bronze dagger. Its shape and bronze composition are different from similar artifacts found in China being described as "The detachable handle is a key feature for distinguishing Liaoning daggers from other Chinese daggers, which were typically produced in one piece." Many have also pointed out the lack of Chinese-influenced archeological remains that are supposed to have flourished during Gija's reign, further discrediting his supposed claims. 

Others have also found loopholes within the Chinese historical texts as well. Many historians allude to Shangshu dazhuan (尚書大傳) being the first mentioning of Gija, which was after almost 800 years of the founding of Gija Joseon. They claim that with the founding of bronze daggers only found in the Liaoning area and not mainland China, and the inconsistency with the dates provided in the texts, Gija's arrival to Gojoseon was a minuscule one or at most, a simple envoy visit.

Currently, Korean historians (from both nations) reject the previously held belief of Gija's involvement in Korea and thus many high school textbooks applied these recent studies reevaluating Gija and his influence with him now only being mentioned in a foot note. Additionally, the 7th edition of the Korean textbooks do not mention Jizi/Gija, making China the only nation to officially support the preceding theory.

See also 
 Cheongju Han clan
 Haengju Ki clan
 Taewon Sunwoo clan
 Icheon Seo clan

Notes

References 
 .
 .
 Imanishi Ryū 今西龍 (1970), Kishi Chōsen densetsu kō 箕子朝鮮伝説考 [On the legend of Gija Joseon (Jizi Chaoxian)], in Chōsen koshi no kenkyū 朝鮮古史の研究 [Research in ancient Korean history], pp. 131–173.
 .
 Kuwano Eiji 桑野栄治 (1959), "Richō shoki no shiten wo tōshite mita Dankun saishi" 李朝初期の祀典を通してみた檀君祭祀 [The worship of Dangun as seen through the state sacrifices of the early Joseon period], Chōsen Gakuhō 朝鮮学報 [Journal of the Academic Association of Koreanology in Japan], Vol. 14, pp. 57–101.
 Sassa Mitsuaki 佐々充昭 (2000), "Dankun nashonarizumu no keisei" 檀君ナショナリズムの形成 [The Formation of Dangun nationalism]. Chōsen Gakuhō 朝鮮学報 [Journal of the Academic Association of Koreanology in Japan], Vol. 174: 61–107.
 .
 .
 .
 .
 Sima Zhen 司馬貞. Shiji suoyin 史記索隱: 中山國 鮮虞, 鮮于氏 姬姓 : Zhongshan Seon Woo clan are Kei Ji (surname) like Zhou Dynasty royal.

11th-century BC Chinese people
Shang dynasty people
Deified Chinese people
Korean people of Chinese descent
Early Korean history
Gija Joseon rulers
Legendary monarchs
Investiture of the Gods characters
Founding monarchs